Susan M. Collins (born 1959/1960) is an American economist who has served as the 14th president and CEO of the Federal Reserve Bank of Boston since July 1, 2022. She is the first African American woman and first woman of color to lead any of the 12 regional Federal Reserve Banks. Collins previously served as provost and executive vice president for academic affairs of the University of Michigan from 2020 to 2022.

Early life and education
Collins is a naturalized U.S. citizen of Jamaican descent, born in Scotland, United Kingdom and raised in New York City. She graduated summa cum laude from Harvard University with a bachelor's in economics in 1980 and earned her PhD in economics from Massachusetts Institute of Technology (MIT) in 1984.

Career
Collins has held various teaching positions at Harvard University, Georgetown University, and the University of Michigan. She also served on the President's Council of Economic Advisers from 1989 to 1990 and was a visiting scholar at the International Monetary Fund in 2001.

She was a senior fellow in the Economic Studies program at the Brookings Institution from 2007 to 2017 and became a nonresident senior fellow after her move to Michigan. 

She served on the Federal Reserve Bank of Chicago board of directors from 2013 to 2022.

Collins is the Edward M. Gramlich Professor of Public Policy and a professor of economics at the University of Michigan, where she also served as dean of the Gerald R. Ford School of Public Policy from 2007 to 2017. She retains the designation of a professor at the university, on unpaid leave. In January 2020, Collins was appointed provost and executive vice president for academic affairs at the University of Michigan. As she stepped down as provost in June 2022, Michigan's Board of Regents awarded her a Regents' Citation of Honor for her dedication and service to the university.

Collins was involved in the controversy surrounding the University of Michigan's reopening during the COVID-19 pandemic. On September 8, 2020, the university's graduate student employees went on strike because of concerns related to the university's pandemic response. As the university's chief academic officer, Collins was involved in negotiations with the graduate students while also urging students not to disrupt campus operations and claiming that the strike was illegal because it was not directly related to "wages, hours, or working conditions." The students disagreed, claiming that the strike directly related to the university's failure to provide a safe working environment which was required by the contract it agreed to only months prior. In a publicly broadcast question and answer session on September 15, 2020, Collins said of the administration's pandemic response: “We have not done nearly as well as we needed to.”

Federal Reserve Bank of Boston
In February 2022, Collins was selected to serve as president and CEO of the Federal Reserve Bank of Boston, becoming the first woman of color to lead any of the 12 regional Reserve Banks. She took office on July 1, 2022.

Selected publications
 Bosworth, Barry, and Susan M. Collins. "Accounting for growth: comparing China and India." Journal of Economic Perspectives 22, no. 1 (2008): 45–66.
 Collins, Susan M., Barry P. Bosworth, and Dani Rodrik. "Economic growth in East Asia: accumulation versus assimilation." Brookings papers on economic activity 1996, no. 2 (1996): 135–203.
 Bosworth, Barry P., Susan M. Collins, and Carmen M. Reinhart. "Capital flows to developing economies: implications for saving and investment." Brookings papers on economic activity 1999, no. 1 (1999): 143–180.
 Razin, Ofair, and Susan M. Collins. Real exchange rate misalignments and growth. No. w6174. National Bureau of Economic Research, 1997.
 Collins, Susan M. "On becoming more flexible: Exchange rate regimes in Latin America and the Caribbean." Journal of Development Economics 51, no. 1 (1996): 117–138.

References

Living people
20th-century African-American educators
20th-century African-American women
20th-century African-American people
20th-century American economists
20th-century American educators
20th-century American women educators
21st-century African-American educators
21st-century African-American women
21st-century American economists
21st-century American educators
21st-century American women educators
African-American economists
American women economists
Brookings Institution people
Federal Reserve Bank of Boston presidents
Gerald R. Ford School of Public Policy faculty
Harvard College alumni
Massachusetts Institute of Technology alumni
United States Council of Economic Advisers
University of Michigan faculty
Year of birth missing (living people)